Manol Manolov (4 August 1925 – 16 December 2008) was a Bulgarian football defender and manager. He was born in Sofia. Manolov featured in 57 games for the Bulgaria national football team and won a bronze medal at the 1956 Summer Olympics. Between 1948 and 1962 he played in 239 matches and scored 8 goals for CSKA Sofia. He was honoured as Bulgarian Footballer of the Year in 1958. Manolov won the top Bulgarian league, the A PFG, a record twelve times (all with CSKA), as well as the Bulgarian Cup, four times (all with CSKA). He coached Beroe, CSKA Sofia, Hebar Pazardzhik, Ethnikos Piraeus, Apollon Athens, Slavia and Panserraikos.

Honours

Player
 CSKA Sofia
 Bulgarian League (12): 1948, 1951, 1952, 1954, 1955, 1956, 1957, 1958, 1959, 1960, 1961, 1962
 Bulgarian Cup (5): 1951, 1954, 1955, 1960,1961

Coach
 CSKA Sofia
 Bulgarian League: 1971, 1972, 1973
 Bulgarian Cup: 1972, 1973, 1985

References

External links
 Bulgarian record-holder Manolov dies, UEFA.com

1925 births
2008 deaths
Bulgarian footballers
Bulgaria international footballers
FC Septemvri Sofia players
PFC CSKA Sofia players
Footballers at the 1952 Summer Olympics
Footballers at the 1956 Summer Olympics
Footballers at the 1960 Summer Olympics
Olympic footballers of Bulgaria
Olympic bronze medalists for Bulgaria
First Professional Football League (Bulgaria) players
Bulgarian football managers
PFC Cherno More Varna managers
PFC Beroe Stara Zagora managers
PFC CSKA Sofia managers
PFC Hebar Pazardzhik managers
Apollon Smyrnis F.C. managers
Ethnikos Piraeus F.C. managers
Panserraikos F.C. managers
Olympic medalists in football
Footballers from Sofia
Medalists at the 1956 Summer Olympics
Association football defenders
Bulgarian expatriate football managers
Bulgarian expatriate sportspeople in Greece
Expatriate football managers in Greece